The 2009–10 Biathlon World Cup – World Cup 4 was the fourth event of the season and was held in Oberhof, Germany from Wednesday, January 6 until Sunday, January 10, 2010.

Schedule of events
The schedule of the event is below

Medal winners

Men

Women

Achievements
 Best performance for all time

 , 7 place in Sprint
 , 16 place in Sprint
 , 17 place in Sprint
 , 31 place in Sprint
 , 36 place in Sprint
 , 67 place in Sprint
 , 75 place in Sprint
 , 76 place in Sprint
 , 82 in Sprint
 , 94 in Sprint
 , 102 in Sprint
 , 3 place in Sprint
 , 10 place in Sprint
 , 28 place in Sprint
 , 45 place in Sprint
 , 57 place in Sprint
 , 63 place in Sprint
 , 74 place in Sprint
 , 81 place in Sprint
 , 82 place in Sprint
 , 84 place in Sprint
 , 86 place in Sprint

 First World Cup race

 , 26 place in Sprint
 , 33 place in Sprint
 , 90 place in Sprint

References

- World Cup 4, 2009-10 Biathlon World Cup
Biathlon
Biathlon competitions in Germany
Sport in Oberhof, Germany
2010 in German sport
Sport in Thuringia
2010s in Thuringia